Rhescyntis hippodamia is a species of moth in the family Saturniidae first described by Pieter Cramer in 1777. It is found from Mexico to Brazil.

The wingspan is 135–150 mm.

Subspecies
Rhescyntis hippodamia hippodamia (Ecuador)
Rhescyntis hippodamia norax Druce, 1879 (Mexico)
Rhescyntis hippodamia colombiana Bouvier, 1927 (Ecuador)

References

Moths described in 1777
Arsenurinae